"Easy" is a pop song by Cuban-American singer Camila Cabello from her second studio album Romance (2019). It was released as the fourth single from the album on October 11, 2019. Cabello co-wrote the song with Justin Tranter and its producers John Hill, Louis Bell, Frank Dukes, Carter Lang, and Westen Weiss. "Easy" debuted in the top 100 of several countries, including Australia, Canada, the UK, Slovakia, and Ireland. Although it did not enter the US Billboard Hot 100, it debuted at number ten on the Bubbling Under Hot 100 chart.

Background and composition 
Cabello announced the song's release on October 9, 2019, via her social media.

"Easy" was written by  Cabello, Justin Tranter, John Hill, Adam Feeney, Louis Bell, Carter Lang and Westen Weiss. It runs for three minutes and sixteen seconds. Hugh McIntyre of Forbes characterized "Easy" as a pop song.

Throughout the track, Cabello can be heard addressing her many insecurities and things that she does not like about herself, such as overthinking to the point where things are ruined, her "crooked teeth" and the stretch marks on her thighs. The track is about how her partner helped her love herself and finding true love for the first time.

Performance video
In February 2021, clips from an unreleased performance video surfaced online.

Live performances 
Cabello performed the song live for the first time on Saturday Night Live on October 12, 2019. She also performed the song with other singles from the album at Apple Music's New Music Daily Presents event for select fans in November 2019. On the 8th of December, Cabello performed the song on Michael McIntyre's Big Show.

Track listings

Credits and personnel
Credits adapted from the liner notes of Romance.

Publishing
 Published by Sony/ATV Songs LLC (BMI) o/b/o Sony/ATV Music Publishing (UK) LTD/Maidmetal Limited (PRS)/Milamoon Songs (BMI) / EMI Blackwood Music Inc. o/b/o EMI Music Publishing LTD (PRS)/MYNY Music (BMI)/Sony/ATV Songs LLC (BMI) o/b/o Sam Fam Beats (BMI), EMI April Music Inc. (ASCAP) / Carter Lang Publishing Designee / Universal Music Corp./Efeel Music/Westen Weiss Prod. LLC (ASCAP) / EMI Pop Music Publishing / Rodeman Music (GMR) / Justin’s School for Girls (BMI) all rights o/b/o itself and Justin’s School for Girls admin. by Warner-Tamerlane Publishing Corp. (BMI)

Recording
 Recorded at Electric Feel Recording Studios, West Hollywood, California
 Mixed at MixStar Studios, Virginia Beach, Virginia
 Mastered at Bernie Grundman Mastering, Hollywood, California

Personnel

 Camila Cabello – vocals, songwriting
 Louis Bell – production, songwriting, recording
 Frank Dukes – production, songwriting
 Carter Lang – production, songwriting
 Westen Weiss – production, songwriting
 John Hill – songwriting
 Justin Tranter – songwriting
 Mike Bozzi – mastering
 Manny Marroquin – mixing

Charts

Certifications

Release history

References 

2019 singles
2019 songs
Camila Cabello songs
Songs written by Camila Cabello
Songs written by Justin Tranter
Songs written by John Hill (record producer)
Songs written by Frank Dukes
Songs written by Louis Bell
Song recordings produced by Frank Dukes
Song recordings produced by Louis Bell
Songs written by Westen Weiss